Rosin is a solid form of resin obtained from pines and some other plants.

Rosin may also refer to:

 Rosin (surname)
 Rosin, Poland, a village
 Rosin (chemical), a glycoside ester

See also
 Mühl Rosin, a municipality in Germany
 Rosine (disambiguation)
 Roisin (disambiguation)